Marwan Marzouk Boodai is a Kuwaiti businessman and currently the vice chairman of Boodai Corp, and chairman of Jazeera Airways. The Boodai Corp runs many businesses in Kuwait such as Jazeera Airways, City Bus, Go City, Limousine Services, and others.

He began working with the Boodai Corporation in 1995.

References 

Year of birth missing (living people)
Living people
Place of birth missing (living people)
Kuwaiti chief executives
Kuwaiti businesspeople
21st-century Kuwaiti businesspeople